Burmocoelus is an extinct genus of Archostematan beetle belonging to the family Ommatidae. It is known from two species, Burmocoleus zhiyuani, which was initially assigned to the genus Brochocoleus this was placed into the new genus Burmocoleus by Kirejtshuk, 2020, who also described a new species, Burmocoleus prisnyi. Both species are known from the Cenomanian aged Burmese amber from Myanmar. Similar to Stegocoleus, Brochocoleus and Jarzembowskiops it has flat, wide elytral edges, but can be distinguished from these genera in several characters, and is more similar to other ommatids in the characters of the prothorax.

References

External links 
 Burmocoelus at Zin.ru (in Russian) with Hi-Res photographs

Ommatidae
Burmese amber
Fossil taxa described in 2020
Prehistoric beetle genera